Cahoon v. Cummings, 734 N.E.2d 535 (Ind. 2000), was a case decided by the Indiana Supreme Court that adopted the loss of a chance doctrine for tort liability.

Decision
The plaintiff brought a wrongful death action alleging that the defendant doctor negligently failed to diagnose the decedent's esophageal cancer.  The trial court instructed the jury to find the defendant liable if the failure to diagnose was deemed a substantial factor in the decedent's death.  The jury found for the plaintiff and the defendant appealed.

The Supreme Court of Indiana eschewed the substantial factor test for liability because it would unfairly hold doctors liable for the patient's underlying disease and all of the damage it caused.  Instead the court adopted the loss of a chance doctrine, which allows recovery if negligence results in a substantially higher probability that harm to the plaintiff will result, even if the probability of harm is already over fifty percent.  The court held that the defendants should only be held liable in proportion to the increased chance of harm caused by their negligence, and the case was remanded for a new trial.

Impact
Cahoon places Indiana among 24 other states that recognize the loss of a chance doctrine, which has been criticized for unpredictably increasing medical malpractice liability.

See also
Molien v. Kaiser Foundation Hospitals (1980), California case

References

External links
Text of opinion from Google Scholar

Negligence case law
United States tort case law
2000 in United States case law
Indiana state case law
2000 in Indiana
Medical malpractice